Lyons Township is the name of some places in the U.S. state of Minnesota:
Lyons Township, Lyon County, Minnesota
Lyons Township, Wadena County, Minnesota

See also: Lyons Township (disambiguation)

Minnesota township disambiguation pages